Hattie Hutchcraft Hill (April 27, 1847 – September 2, 1921) was an American artist from Paris, Kentucky who studied art and painted in Paris, France.

Early life and education
Harriet Amanda Hutchraft was born to her parents, James and Elizabeth Hutchcraft, on April 27, 1847 in Bourbon County, Kentucky. She was the sixth of her parents' nine children. She married a man named William Hill from Illinois in 1866.

She visited the Paris World's Fair (the Exposition Universelle (1878)) with one of her sisters in 1878, which may have inspired or encouraged her ambitions to become a painter. In 1888 she returned to Europe, traveling through Italy, Spain, and France, where she met with the painter Rosa Bonheur, and in 1890 she settled in Paris and enrolled in art school at the Académie Julian, studying with Jean-Joseph Benjamin-Constant and Jules Joseph Lefebvre.

Career as artist
Hill is most known for oil works, consisting mainly of still-life, portraits, landscapes and marine pictures. She painted under the name "H. Hutchcraft Hill". 

While in France, Hill exhibited in two Paris Salons. After returning to the United States, she maintained a portrait studio in Los Angeles from 1895 to 1898.  Back at her home in Bourbon County, Kentucky Hill became a prolific painter and china-painting teacher. She was a close friend of Sarah Bernhardt, of whom she painted a portrait. She painted a portrait series of Bourbon County judges which hangs in the Bourbon County Courthouse. Hill lived, painted, and taught in Paris, Kentucky until her death in 1921.

References

External links

 Hattie Hutchcraft Hill scrapbook at the Archives of American Art
 

Artists from Kentucky
Kentucky women artists

People from Paris, Kentucky
Académie Julian alumni
1847 births
1921 deaths